Manor House Resort Hotel is a hotel situated seven miles from Enniskillen, County Fermanagh, Northern Ireland, that occupies a 19th-century manor house overlooking Lough Erne. Facilities include a swimming pool, steam room, jacuzzi, sauna, fully equipped gymnasium, restaurant, and business and conference centre. It is a four star hotel and is listed in the Taste of Ulster guide.

History
Captain John Irvine, whose brother was Colonel Christopher Irvine of Castle Irvine, acquired the Killadeas estate in 1660. The Manor House was then known as Rockfield. The name was changed to Killadeas Manor House by Major John Irvine, who acquired Killadeas in 1835 and died in 1860.

References

Hotels in County Fermanagh